The Conservative Climate Caucus is a caucus within the United States House of Representatives composed of 73 members. It was founded by Representative John Curtis (R-Utah) in 2021 during the 117th United States Congress. The caucus's self-declared purpose is to "Educate House Republicans on climate policies and legislation consistent with conservative values".

Members 
Last updated: April 22, 2022

Arizona
 Paul Gosar (AZ-04)
 Debbie Lesko (AZ-04)

Arkansas
 French Hill (AR-02)
 Rick Crawford (AR-01)
 Bruce Westerman (AR-04)

California
 Jay Obernolte (CA-08)
 David Valadao (CA-21)
 Young Kim (CA-39)
 Michelle Steel (CA-48)

Colorado
 Doug Lamborn (CO-05)

Florida
 John H. Rutherford (FL-04)
 Michael Waltz (FL-06)
 Mario Rafael Díaz-Balart Caballero (FL-25)
 Carlos Antonio Giménez (FL-26)
 Maria Elvira Salazar (FL-27)

Georgia
 Buddy Carter (GA-01)
 Drew Ferguson (GA-03)

Illinois
 Darin Lahood (IL-18)

Indiana
 Jim Baird (IN-04)
 Larry Dean Bucshon (IN-08)

Iowa
 Mariannette Miller-Meeks (IA-02)

Kentucky
 Brett Guthrie (KY-02)
 Andy Barr (KY-06)

Louisiana
 Garret Graves (LA-06)

Michigan
 Peter Meijer (MI-03)
 Fred Upton (MI-06)
 Tim Walberg (MI-07)

Mississippi
 Steven Palazzo (MS-04)

Nevada
 Mark Amodei (NV-02)

New Jersey
 Jeff Van Drew (NJ-02)

New York
 Andrew Garbarino (NY-02)
 Nicole Malliotakis  (NY-11)
 Lee Zeldin (NY-01)

North Dakota
 Kelly Armstrong (ND-AL)

Ohio
 Troy Balderson (OH-12)
 David Joyce (OH-14)
 Anthony Gonzalez (OH-23)

Oklahoma
 Markwayne Mullin (OK-02)
 Frank Lucas (OK-03)
 Stephanie Bice (OK-05)

Oregon
 Cliff Bentz (OR-02)

Pennsylvania
 Fred Keller (PA-12)
 Glenn Thompson (PA-15)

South Carolina
 Nancy Mace (SC-01)
 William Timmons (SC-04)
 Tom Rice (SC-07)

South Dakota
 Dusty Johnson (SD-AL)

Tennessee

Texas
 Pat Fallon (TX-04)
 Mike McCaul (TX-10)
 August Pfluger (TX-11)
 Randy Weber (TX-14)
 Roger Williams (TX-25)
 Michael Burgess (TX-26)
 Michael Cloud (TX-27)

Utah
 Blake Moore (UT-01)
 Chris Stewart (UT-02)
 John Curtis (UT-03) (chair)
 Burgess Owens (UT-04)

Virginia
 Robert Wittman (VA-01)
 Morgan Griffith (VA-09)

Washington
 Jaime Herrera Beutler (WA-03)
 Dan Newhouse (WA-04)
 Cathy McMorris Rodgers (WA-05)

Wisconsin
 Bryan Steil (WI-01)

West Virginia
 David McKinley (WV-01)

References 

Caucuses of the United States Congress
Republican Party (United States) organizations
2021 establishments in Washington, D.C.